Mad Dog Oil Field is an offshore oil field located along the Sigsbee Escarpment at Green Canyon blocks 825, 826 and 782, Western Atwater Foldbelt, Gulf of Mexico.

The field was discovered in May 1998 and it became operational in 2005. It is owned by BP (60.5%), BHP (23.9%), and Chevron Corporation (15.6%). The operator is BP.

Oil is transported to Ship Shoal 332B via the Caesar pipeline, while natural gas is transported via the Cleopatra pipeline.

The field is operated by using a spar oil platform manufactured in Finland. Its weight is 20,800 tonnes. It includes production facilities with 13 production slots, a drilling riser slot and two service slots, and quarters for 126 personnel. The front-end engineering design of the second spar will be done by Technip.

It was reported on September 16, 2008 that Mad Dog was damaged due to Hurricane Ike. The drilling derrick was toppled over and was on the sea bed. A new drilling package was built and replaced the damaged one on the spar in early 2012.

See also
Offshore oil and gas in the US Gulf of Mexico

References

External links
 BP's Mad Dog Page
 BP Says Mad Dog Drilling Derrick Toppled 

Gulf of Mexico oil fields of the United States
BP oil and gas fields
BHP
Chevron Corporation oil and gas fields